Frederik Lindbøg Børsting (born 13 February 1995) is a Danish professional footballer who plays for Norwegian First Division side SK Brann.

Club career

AaB
Børsting played for RKG Klarup until he was 12 years old, before joining AaB. He was promoted to the first team in the summer 2014. He got his Danish Superliga debut on 26 July 2014 when he was in the line-up against FC Midtjylland. Børsting was surprised over all the time he got in his first season at the first team. He played 19 league games and two Europe League games in his first season, which the player hadn't expected.

He quickly became a profile for both AaB and the Danish U21 national team. After a great 2015/16 season, he extended his contract in March 2016 until 2019.
Following his extension, he was part of the Denmark team at the 2016 Olympics and played all four matches until Denmark was eliminated in the quarter final.

Brann
On 15 February 2022 AaB confirmed, that Børsting would join Norwegian club SK Brann with effect from 1 July 2022, when his contract with AaB expired. However, the deal was accelerated when Brann confirmed on 9 March 2022 that Børsting would instead move to the club with immediate effect for a fee around 1,5 million DKK.

References

External links 
 
 Frederik Børsting at DBU

1995 births
Living people
Danish men's footballers
Danish expatriate men's footballers
Denmark under-21 international footballers
Footballers at the 2016 Summer Olympics
Olympic footballers of Denmark
Association football midfielders
People from Aalborg Municipality
AaB Fodbold players
SK Brann players
Danish Superliga players
Danish expatriate sportspeople in Norway
Expatriate footballers in Norway
Sportspeople from the North Jutland Region